Diether Pascual Ocampo (born July 19, 1973) is a Filipino actor, singer, model and comedian.

Background
Diether Pascual Ocampo was born on July 19, 1973 in Aniban, Bacoor, Cavite, where he attended school. He attended De La Salle University-Dasmarinas. He is of German, Spanish, and Chinese ancestry.

He started out as a dancer before being discovered by ABS-CBN in the mid-1990s. He is part of the band Blow, where he is known as 'Capt. Mongrel'. In 2001, he was an executive producer for The Pin-Ups debut album, Hello Pain, that enabled the band to become the first Philippines-based band to be signed to a U.S. label.

Ocampo started with ABS-CBN and being managed by Star Magic headed by Johnny Manahan. He auditioned for ABS-CBN's talent search in 1995. A year and a half later, he became one of the members of Star Circle Batch II. His first movie appearance was in the movie adaptation of teen program Ang TV. He is active in charitable works through his K.I.D.S. (Kabataan Inyong Dapat Suportahan) Foundation to help under privileged children of Metro Manila.

In 2016, he starred in TV5's series Bakit Manipis ang Ulap? together with Cesar Montano and Claudine Barretto. 

In 2017, after a short brief break from showbiz, Ocampo went out of retirement and is now a freelancer.

Currently, he is serving in the Philippine Coast Guard Auxiliary as a Lieutenant Commander.

Other
In 2007, Ocampo starred in an anti-zoo ad for PETA-Asia Pacific.

Personal life
Ocampo was married to Kristine Hermosa on September 21, 2004. The marriage was later annulled on January 30, 2009.

Filmography

Television

Film

Awards and nominations

References

External links
 

1974 births
Living people
Filipino people of German descent
Filipino people of Spanish descent
Filipino people of Chinese descent
Filipino male television actors
Filipino male models
People from Bacoor
Male actors from Cavite
Filipino male comedians
ABS-CBN personalities
21st-century Filipino male singers
Filipino male film actors
20th-century Filipino male actors
21st-century Filipino male actors